Amanda Strong is a Michif Indigenous filmmaker, media artist and stop-motion director based out of the unceded Coast Salish territory in Vancouver, British Columbia. She has exhibited work and her films have been screened at festivals worldwide, including Cannes Film Festival, Toronto International Film Festival, Vancouver International Film Festival, and the Ottawa International Animation Festival.

Film career 
Strong's films tell Indigenous stories through a style she calls "hybrid documentary" as she combines stop-motion animation with new media technology. Strong's style merges genres such as documentary, animation and more traditional narrative driven storytelling. Her background is in photography, illustration, and media. She often works collaboratively, such as in her films Indigo and Mia.

The themes of reclamation of Indigenous histories, lineages, languages and cultures often appear in her works.

Strong is the founder of Spotted Fawn Productions, a production studio that provides mentorship and training opportunities for emerging and diverse artists.

Strong engages with communities by curating, facilitating, programming, and teaching youth across Canada.

Personal life and education 
She is from Vancouver, British Columbia, but grew up in Mississauga, Ontario and has lived in Toronto, Ontario and Montreal, Quebec.

Strong studied illustration, media, and photography at Sheridan College Institute of Technology and Advanced Learning in Oakville, Ontario.

Awards and grants 
Strong has received grants from the Canada Council for the Arts, Ontario Arts Council and the National Film Board of Canada. In 2009, Strong was the recipient of the ImagineNATIVE/LIFT mentorship. In 2013, Strong was awarded the K.M. Hunter Artist Award for Film and Video. In 2015, she was awarded the Vancouver Mayor's Arts Award for Emerging Media Artist. In 2016, she was selected by Alanis Obomsawin to receive $50,000 in services from Technicolor as part of Obomsawin's Clyde Gilmour Technicolor Award at the 2016 Toronto Film Critics Association Awards. The film Mia that Strong co-directed with Bracken Hanuse Corlett won the Golden Sheaf Award for Best Aboriginal at the 2016 Yorkton Film Festival.  In 2018, she was awarded best script as well as Special Mention for her short film Biidaaban at the Ottawa International Animation Festival. Biidaaban is also a nominee for best animated short in the 2019 Canadian Screen Awards

Filmography

References

External links 
 
 Amanda Strong on Vimeo

Living people
Date of birth missing (living people)
Canadian women activists
Canadian people of Métis descent
Canadian people of Cree descent
Canadian people of French descent
Canadian people of Scottish descent
Canadian people of Irish descent
Canadian animated film directors
Canadian animated film producers
Canadian women film directors
Canadian women film producers
Canadian women animators
Métis filmmakers
Sheridan College alumni
Stop motion animators
Artists from Vancouver
Film directors from Vancouver
Year of birth missing (living people)